Lorman is an unincorporated community located in Jefferson County, Mississippi, United States.

Lorman is the nearest community to Alcorn State University, in Claiborne County, the alma mater of former NFL quarterback Steve McNair. Its ZIP code is 39096.

History
Lorman is located on the former Illinois Central Railroad. A post office operated under the name Lee from 1884 to 1899 and first began operating under the name Lorman in 1899.

Lorman is home to multiple historic plantations, including Blantonia Plantation, Canemount Plantation, China Grove, Prospect Hill Plantation, and Rosswood.

Notable person
 Bill Foster, member of the Baseball Hall of Fame and former head baseball coach of Alcorn State University.

References

Unincorporated communities in Jefferson County, Mississippi
Unincorporated communities in Mississippi